"Bella ciao" ("Goodbye beautiful") is an Italian protest folk song from the late 19th century, originally sung by the mondina workers in protest against the harsh working conditions in the paddy fields of Northern Italy.

It is widely assumed that the mondina song was modified and adopted as an anthem of the Italian resistance movement by the partisans who opposed nazism and fascism, and fought against the occupying forces of Nazi Germany, who were allied with the fascist and collaborationist Italian Social Republic between 1943 and 1945 during the Italian Civil War. However, some historians argue that there is little to no evidence that Italian partisans actually sang the song.

Versions of "Bella ciao" continue to be sung worldwide as a hymn of freedom and resistance.

History
     
The origins of the song are unclear, although one hypothesis is that "Bella Ciao" was originally sung as "Alla mattina appena alzata" ("In the morning as soon as I woke up") by seasonal workers of paddy fields of rice, especially in Italy's Po Valley from the late 19th century to the first half of the 20th century, with different lyrics. They worked at mondare (weeding) the rice fields in northern Italy, to help the healthy growth of young rice plants. This work was performed during the flooding of the fields, from the end of April to the beginning of June every year. During this time, the first stages of their development, the delicate shoots needed to be protected from the difference in temperature between the day and the night. It consisted of two phases: transplanting the plants and pruning the weeds.

Mondare was an extremely tiring task, carried out primarily by women known as mondina, from the poorest social classes. They would spend their workdays with bare feet in water up to their knees, and their backs bent continuously. The atrocious working conditions, long hours and very low pay led to constant dissatisfaction and, at times, to rebellious movements and riots in the early years of the 20th century. The struggles against the supervising padroni were even harder, with plenty of clandestine workers ready to compromise even further the already low wages just to get work. Besides "Bella ciao", similar songs of the mondina women included "" and "".

Other versions of the antecedents of "Bella ciao" appeared over the years, indicating that "Alla mattina appena alzata" must have been composed in the latter half of the 19th century. The earliest written version is dated back to 1906 and comes from near Vercelli, Piedmont.

As a partisan song 
There are no indications of the relevance of "Bella ciao" among the partisan brigades, nor of the very existence of the 'partisan version' prior to the first publication of the text in 1953. There are no traces in the documents of the immediate postwar period nor its presence in important songbooks. It is not, for example, in Pasolini's 1955  nor in the Canti Politici of Editori Riuniti of 1962. The 1963 version of Yves Montand shot to fame after the group Il Nuovo Canzoniere Italiano presented it at the 1964 Festival dei Due Mondi at Spoleto both as a song of the mondine and as a partisan hymn, and the latter so "inclusive" that it could hold together the various political souls of the national liberation struggle (Catholics, Communists, Socialists, Liberals...) and even be sung at the end of the Christian Democracy (Democrazia Cristiana) 1975 congress which elected the former partisan Zaccagnini as national secretary".

As reported in the text by Roberto Battaglia History of the Italian Resistance popular songs of the era were Fischia il vento and the aria of the famous Soviet folk song Katjuša, which became the official anthem of the Garibaldi Partisan Brigades.

Even the well-known journalist, former partisan and historian of the partisan struggle, Giorgio Bocca publicly stated:

These statements were later certified by Carlo Pestelli in his book Bella ciao. The song of freedom, in which he reconstructs the origins and spread of the song.

Even the historians of the Italian song Antonio Virgilio Savona and Michele Straniero have affirmed that "Bella ciao" was not sung or was rarely sung during the partisan war, but was widespread immediately after the Second World War.

Only a few voices, such as that of the historians Cesare Bermani and Ruggero Giacomini, claim that some version of "Bella ciao" was sung by some brigades during the Resistance, although not necessarily in the now popular 'partisan version', of whose existence, as specified above, there is no documentary evidence until the 1950s.

The text as sung today was first published in 1953 in the magazine La Lapa, and then in L'Unità in 1957.

Melody 

A possible origin of the melody was identified by researcher Fausto Giovannardi, following the discovery of a Yiddish melody (Koilen song) recorded by a Klezmer accordionist of Ukrainian origin, Mishka Ziganoff, in 1919 in New York. According to the scholar Rod Hamilton of The British Library in London, "Koilen" would be a version of "Dus Zekele Koilen" (The bag of coal), of which there are various versions dating back to the 1920s.

Italian folksinger Giovanna Daffini recorded the song in 1962. The music is in quadruple meter.

Lyrics

Mondine version

Partisan version

Covers 
One of the most famous recordings is that of the Italian folk singer Giovanna Daffini who recorded both the mondina and the partisan versions. It appears in her 1975 album Amore mio non piangere. Many artists have recorded the song, including Herbert Pagani, Mary Hopkin, Sandie Shaw, and Manu Chao.
 1964: Yves Montand as a single
 1965: Milva as a single taken from her album Canti della libertà
 1969: Quilapayún in the album Basta As a response to the regime of Augusto Pinochet
 1975: Giovanna Daffini in her album Amore mio non piangere
 1993: Modena City Ramblers on the album Combat Folk
 1993: Banda Bassotti on the album Gridalo Forte Records
 2001: Anita Lane on the album "Sex O'Clock"
 2010: Talco on the album Combat Circus
 2018: Marc Ribot and Tom Waits on the album Songs of Resistance 1942–2018 by Marc Ribot
 2018: Steve Aoki and Marnik published another EDM version
 2019: Amparo Sánchez and Juan Pinilla released a Flamenca interpretation for the congress of the European Left
 2020: Daniele Vitale played "Bella Ciao" in from a balcony in Italy during the COVID-19 period of self-isolation during the Spring
 2021: Helmut Lotti released "Italian Songbook" with Bella Ciao as track number 5
 2021: The Rebel Riot band from Myanmar(Burma) remade a cover song with Burmese language version "Bella Ciao"
 2021: Becky G as a single
 2022: As a part of Hearts of Iron IV's new DLC By Blood Alone, Paradox released a choir version of Bella Ciao arranged by Håkan Glänte and performed by Göteborg Baroque.

International versions 
In addition to the original Italian, the song has been recorded by various artists in many different languages, including Albanian, Arabic, Armenian, Belarusian, Bosnian, Breton, Bengali, Burmese,
Catalan, Chinese, Croatian, Czech, Danish, English, Esperanto, Finnish, German, Greek, Hindi, Hungarian, Hebrew, Japanese, Kashmiri, Kurdish, Persian, Macedonian, Malayalam, Marathi, Norwegian, Occitan, Punjabi, Russian, Serbian, Slovak, Spanish, Syriac, Swedish, Tagalog, Tamil, Telugu, Thai, Tibetan, Turkish, Ukrainian and Yiddish.
 Azerbaijani Soviet singer Muslim Magomayev performed the song at some of his concerts and he stated that it was Brezhnev's favorite by him.
 The Chinese version of the song featured in the Chinese translation of the Yugoslavian film The Bridge.
 A rewritten version of the song can be heard on Chumbawamba's acoustic album A Singsong and a Scrap.
 Another version of the song was recorded by the punk rock band Dog Faced Hermans on their album, Every Day Time Bomb.
 Former Yugoslav punk rock bands KUD Idijoti and later Goblini recorded their versions of the track.
 Hungarian punk rock band Aurora has performed the song.
 Folk musician Leslie Fish has written and performed several versions of the song, one of which can be found on the album Smoked Fish.
 Folk artist Mirah lent her voice to this song on her 2004 album, To All We Stretch the Open Arm.
 Anita Lane recorded a version in English for her 2001 album, Sex O'Clock.
 Breton folk punk band Les Ramoneurs de menhirs recorded a version in Breton and French but called it "BellARB".
 Swedish progg group Knutna nävar included a version in Swedish named I Alla Länder on their album  from 1973.
 Danish psychedelic rock group The Savage Rose have recorded a version of this song on the albums En Vugge Af Stål from 1982 and Ild Og Frihed (1989).
 San Francisco punk band La Plebe perform "Bella Ciao" on their album, Brazo en Brazo.
 French-born musician of Spanish origin Manu Chao has also recorded a version of the song.
 Kurdish Singer Ciwan Haco has included the song in his album Çaw Bella 1989 – Bochum – Germany. He sang it in Kurmanji Kurdish He added the Kurmanji masculine vocative case article 'lo' to the lyrics to give it some locality.
 Kurdish music band Koma Dengê Azadî has also included the song with a different style in their album Çaw Bella 1991 – Istanbul – Turkey. The song was revived during ISIS attack on Kobane 2014.
 The tune has been used in the song "Pilla Chao" from the 2011 Telugu language film Businessman, composed by S. Thaman and also dubbed as "Penne Chaavu" in the Malayalam version of the same film.
 The 2013 Hindi language film Besharam starring Ranbir Kapoor uses the tune in the song "Love Ki Ghanti."
 Italian ska punk band Talco recorded the song on their 2006 album Combat Circus.
 German Liedermacher Hannes Wader recorded a German version on 
 Konstantin Wecker and Hannes Wader performed it live on their collaboration album Was für eine Nacht.
 Turkish band Grup Yorum have recorded a Turkish translation of the song on their 1988 album Haziranda Ölmek Zor / Berivan.
 Turkish band Bandista has recorded a Turkish version, "Hoşçakal", on their album Daima!, in 2011.
 Bosnian musician Goran Bregović has recorded one version on his album Champagne for Gypsies (2012).
 German folk duo Zupfgeigenhansel recorded a free adaptation on their 1982 album Miteinander that, instead of glorifying the death of the partisan, paints him as a reluctant anti-hero who is scared and despises war, but feels he has no other choice because of the atrocities he has seen.
 Thai anti-fascism band Faiyen recorded a Thai version of the song called "Plodploy Plianplaeng" ("Liberate and Change"). It has been used by the Red Shirts anti-fascism group since 2011.
 Spanish punk rock band Boikot recorded a modified version in Spanish.
 An a cappella version was recorded by The Swingle Singers in 1991 on their album Folk Music Around The World.
 Belarusian folk punk band Dzieciuki recorded a modified version in Belarusian under the name "Трымайся, браце!" ("Hold fast, brother!").
 Patric recorded "Bèla Ciaò", a version in Occitan for his 2010 album, Colors.
 Mike Singer recorded an Electro dance version in June 2018.
 In August 2018, Škampi na Žaru, an occasional musical project of Slovak Radio Expres, published the song with Slovak lyrics.
 Hardwell and Maddix released an EDM version of the song in 2018.
 American DJ Steve Aoki and Marnik also made an EDM version in 2018.
 Marc Ribot collaborated with Tom Waits to create their own version for 2018. It is the first song Tom Waits has done in 2 years. This appears on the Marc Ribot album Songs of Resistance 1942–2018.
 In 2019, Extinction Rebellion modified the text to suit their mission and named their new version "Rebella Ciao".
 In 2019, Spanish singer Najwa released her take on the Spanish version of the song, that later served as the music in the ending credits of the fourth season of Money Heist (in which she plays Alicia Sierra).
 On 23 February 2020 Kashmiri version of the song was released by Zanaan Wanaan, an independent feminist collective based in Kashmir, to protest against the Indian government in the region of Kashmir.
 In September 2019, Lebanese singer Shiraz released her remixed version of the song that topped the Lebanese Singles Chart.
 In October 2019, in CAA and NRC protests Poojan Sahil, made a Hindi version "Wapas Jao" of Bella Ciao in Hindi.
 On 6 January 2020, a Hindi version of this song was used by protesters in Mumbai who were agitating against the Indian government (Citizenship Amendment Act protests).
 2018: DJ Ötzi covered the song with German lyrics. 
 In the 2020 Slim by-election, Barisan Nasional specifically Pergerakan Pemuda UMNO supporters adopted the song's melody, modified it in Malay under the name "Cukuplah Sekali Ditipu" ("It's enough to be cheated once") referring to the former Pakatan Harapan administration from 2018 to 2020. The song, with rendition, later regained popularity among BN supporters in the 2022 Malaysian General Elections, which was uploaded on the official YouTube channel of UMNO.
 On 17 December 2020, with the rise of Farmers Protest in India, Poojan Sahil, made a rendition (not translation) of Bella Ciao in Punjabi against the new farm laws in India.
 In 2020, protest group Men In Black Denmark, used the song's melody, renaming it "Mette Ciao", referring to Danish Prime Minister Mette Frederiksen.
 During the Coronavirus pandemic in 2020 and inspired by the La Casa de Papel TV series, six Armenian pop stars – Nick Egibyan, Sofi Mkheyan, Hayko, Erik Karapetyan, Emmy, Nerses Avetisyan – came together to release the Armenian version of the song, with original lyrics by Aram Topchyan. The collaboration has been described as a fun “challenge,” without keeping the song's original protest meaning.
 Zin Linn, a Burmese student activist, wrote the Burmese version of the song and it was sung in several demonstrations in Myanmar, during the nationwide protest against the military coup in early 2021.
 In 2022, Samanalee Fonseka and Indrachapa Liyanage together with National People's Power released a Sinhalese cover "Enawaadoo" ("Will you come?") a day before holding 9 July Sri Lankan protests caused the president and the prime minister to step down taking accountability of the economic crisis and shortage of basic supplies caused by corruption, mismanagement and wrong decisions.
 The Norwegian group Samvirkelaget (a collaboration between rap group Gatas Parlament and ska band Hopalong Knut) released a version of the song on their 2007 album Musikk.

In popular culture
As an internationally known hymn of freedom, it was intoned at many historic and revolutionary events. The song originally aligned itself with Italian partisans fighting against Nazi German occupation troops, but has since become to merely stand for the inherent rights of all people to be liberated from tyranny.

Renewed popularity 

In 2017 and 2018, the song received renewed popularity due to the singing of "Bella ciao" multiple times in the Spanish television series Money Heist. The character Tokyo recounts in one of her narrations, "The life of the Professor revolved around a single idea: Resistance. His grandfather, who had fought against the fascists in Italy, taught him the song and he taught us." The song is played in emblematic moments in the series as a metaphor for freedom. The part 2 finale is also titled "Bella ciao."

As a result of the popularity of the series, there was a flood of music releases in 2018:
 El Profesor and Berlin original version from the series.
 New Brazilian bass version of the song by Alok, Bhaskar, Jetlag Music, André Sarate and Adolfo Celdran.
 In April 2018, Dutch hardstyle DJ duo Gunz For Hire (Ran-D & Adaro) released a remix of the song.
 On 18 May 2018, a completely revamped French version with new French-language lyrics keeping a few lines in Italian was released by Maître Gims, Vitaa, Dadju, Slimane and Naestro. The version topped SNEP, the official French Singles Chart and was certified Diamond in 2020.
 In June 2018, the German pop singer Mike Singer released his own version that charted on the German Singles Chart.
 In June 2018, DJs Steve Aoki and Marnik released an EDM cover of "Bella Ciao".
 In August 2018, Dutch DJs Maddix and Hardwell released their own twist on the popular song.
 On 21 May 2020, a version from Grup Yorum, of which two members had died due to a hunger strike, was aired instead of the Adhan from some minarets in İzmir; the authorities arrested a woman for the act the same day.
 In May 2021, American rapper Hopsin sampled the song in "Be11a Ciao". He cites Netflix series La Casa De Papel as his inspiration for including it in a song.

Miscellaneous 
In 2012, the melody of "Bella ciao" has also been adopted with adapted lyrics as a worldwide environmental activist song ("Do it now"), demanding political action against global warming.

The melody is often used as a football chant by Italian ultras groups of Cosenza Calcio, A.S. Livorno and also outside of Italy by Celtic Cliftonville F.C., Royale Union Saint-Gilloise, A.E.K., Portland Timbers, Atlanta United FC, Austin FC, Motherwell, Aris Thessaloniki, Panathinaikos F.C., SK Brann and FC Zürich fans.

In April 2018, supporters from the Portuguese soccer club F.C. Porto adapted the song with the lyrics "" ("Bye bye fifth"), referring to the lost opportunity by rival club S.L. Benfica to win a fifth national championship in a row, a feat only F.C. Porto has achieved in the country.

The song was also adapted by Brazilian fans during World Cup 2018 to tease and taunt Argentina about their possible exit in the first round, which eventually did not occur, with references to Argentine players Di María, Mascherano, and Messi (Brazil and Argentina have a well-known football rivalry).

The song was the inspiration for the #EleNão movement against right wing Brazilian presidential candidate Jair Bolsonaro.

During nationwide protests in Colombia in 2019, the anti-fascist song was adapted by demonstrators to oppose the government of Iván Duque of the Centro Democrático party, who have been for years questioned or investigated for systematic violations of the Constitution, the environment, Human Rights and Crimes against humanity. As the presidential period of Duque ends in 2022, since 2019 the song, dubbed as 'Duque Chao', is sung and interpreted in protests in Colombia and by the diáspora, also during the national strike demonstrations of April and May 2021, in which citizens have been killed, injured and disappeared by state police forces.

In March 2020, the song once again gained international attention after Europeans and Italians in lockdown due to the COVID-19 pandemic in Italy and Europe sang "Bella ciao" from the balconies of their housing complexes. Also Macedonian singers Aleksandar and Dac in 2020 created a Macedonian language version of the song titled Корона чао (Korona čao).

The song is featured in 2021's Far Cry 6, with lyrics modified in Spanish referring to the game's storyline about guerrilla's movement against dictatorship.

In 2022, the Pressburg Mint (Slovakia) released a commemorative silver coin under the authority of Niue featuring 'El Profesor' from the Money Heist on the reverse, and the full text of the partisan version of the song on the obverse.

The song is also a part of the soundtrack available through pre-order for the "By Blood Alone" package of downloadable content for the World War 2-set strategy game Hearts of Iron IV by Paradox Interactive, which was released in late September 2022.

Filmography 
"Bella Ciao" has been used many times in soundtracks of films. Examples include:
 1969: "Most (Savage Bridge)", directed by Hajrudin Krvavac, Yugoslavia.
 2000: À l'attaque! directed by Robert Guédiguian.
 2006: No Mercy for the Rude is a South Korean neo-noir action comedy film directed by Park Chul-hee.
 2010: L'Immortel directed by Richard Berry, where "Bella Ciao" is sung by a prisoner.
 2012: Businessman directed by Puri Jagannadh, where "Pilla Chao" is sung by Vijay Surya.
Music director : S Thaman
 2013: "Besharam" directed by Abhinav Kashyap, where "Love Ki Ghanti" is sung by Sujeet Shetty, Ranbir Kapoor, & Amitosh Nagpal.
 2017: Money Heist, Spanish TV series, sung many times by the robbers.
 2018: Bella Ciao!, a feature film. Whistled on soundtrack during the beginning title and performed by The Carnival Band in a scene.
 2019: The Two Popes, a biographical film directed by Fernando Meirelles.
 2020: There Is No Evil, Iranian drama film directed by Mohammad Rasoulof.

See also 
  – another Italian revolutionary song
  – another song associated with the Italian partisans
  – another Italian partisan song
  - A Yiddish partisan song popularized during WW2

References

External links 

 Text of "Bella ciao" in 50 languages, with commentaries
 Bella Ciao video illustrated with WWII period partisan photos

Songs about labor
Songs about freedom
Anti-fascist music
Italian patriotic songs
Italian resistance movement
Italian songs
Italian folk songs
Songwriter unknown
Year of song unknown
Italian-language songs
Italian partisan songs